Don Grierson may refer to:

 Don Grierson (geneticist) (born 1945), British geneticist
 Don Grierson (ice hockey) (born 1947), Canadian ice hockey player
 Don Grierson (music business) (1940s–2019), UK-born music industry executive